Dušan Alimpijević (born 9 March 1986) is a Serbian basketball coach who is currently head coach of Frutti Extra Bursaspor of the Turkish Super League (BSL).

Coaching career

Early years
Alimpijević coached Vojvodina Srbijagas from Novi Sad and Spartak from Subotica of the Basketball League of Serbia. In 2017, he coached FMP for the 2016–17 Serbia Super League and finished on the second place.

Crvena zvezda

On 21 July 2017 Alimpijević was named a head coach of the Belgrade team Crvena zvezda. He made his Adriatic League debut as head coach on 1 October in an 88–77 home win over the Mornar Bar. On 13 October he made his EuroLeague debut in a 76–78 road loss from the Žalgiris Kaunas. In the EuroLeague Round 2 on 20 October 2017 he made his first EuroLeague win in a home game against FC Barcelona Lassa. Crvena zvezda was eliminated in the regular season of 2017–18 EuroLeague with 11–19 record. In April 2018, Crvena zvezda as the defending champions of the ABA League lost the title to Budućnost Podgorica with 3–1 record in the finals series, thus way failing to secure a spot in 2018–19 EuroLeague. In May 2018, he was sacked by the club after a series of bad results.

Alimpijević got his first taste of the NBA through Summer League coaching stint in 2018 season with Dallas Mavericks.

Avtodor Saratov
On 19 November 2018 Alimpijević was named a head coach of the Russian team Avtodor Saratov. Avtodor Saratov parted ways with him on 30 January 2019.

Bursaspor
On November 24, 2020, was named the head coach of Frutti Extra Bursaspor of the Turkish Super League (BSL). In April 2021, he signed a three-year extension contract. In May 2022, Alimpijević won the EuroCup Basketball Coach of the Year award for the 2021–22 season.

In July 2022, Alimpijević joined the San Antonio Spurs coaching staff for the 2022 NBA Summer League.

Coaching record

EuroLeague

|- 
| align="left"|Crvena zvezda
| align="left"|2017–18
| 30 || 11 || 19 ||  || align="center"|Eliminated in regular season
|-class="sortbottom"
| align="center" colspan=2|Career||30||11||19||||

EuroCup

|- 
| align="left"|Bursaspor
| align="left"|2020–21
| 10 || 3 || 7 ||  || align="center"| Eliminated in regular season
|- 
| align="left"|Bursaspor
| align="left"|2021–22
| 22 || 11 || 11 ||  || align="center"| Lost Finals
|-class="sortbottom"
| align="center" colspan=2|Career||32||14||17||||

Domestic Leagues

|- 
| align="left"|Crvena zvezda
| align="left"|2017–18
| 7 || 5 || 2 ||  || align="center"| Fired
|- 
| align="left"|Avtodor Saratov
| align="left"|2018–19
| 26 || 9 || 17 ||  || align="center"| Eliminated in regular season
|- 
| align="left"|Bursaspor
| align="left"|2020–21
| 30 || 13 || 17 ||  || align="center"| Eliminated in regular season
|- 
| align="left"|Bursaspor
| align="left"|2021–22
| 33 || 19 || 14 ||  || align="center"| Lost Quarterfinals series
|-class="sortbottom"
| align="center" colspan=2|Career||96||46||50||||

See also 
 List of KK Crvena zvezda head coaches

References

External links

 Dušan Alimpijević at aba-liga.com
 Dušan Alimpijević at euroleague.net

1986 births
Living people
Basketbol Süper Ligi head coaches
BC Avtodor coaches
KK Crvena zvezda head coaches
KK FMP coaches
KK Vojvodina Srbijagas coaches
KK Vojvodina players
KK Spartak Subotica coaches
Serbian expatriate basketball people in Russia
Serbian expatriate basketball people in Turkey
Serbian men's basketball coaches
Serbian men's basketball players